The 2022 FairBreak Invitational T20 was a women's Twenty20 cricket competition, which took place from 4 to 15 May 2022 in Dubai. The tournament, sanctioned by the ICC, was privately-run by FairBreak Global, a company that aims to promote gender equality. Players from 35 countries were spread across six teams. The tournament was won by Tornadoes, who beat Falcons in the final by 8 wickets.

Competition format
Teams played each other team once, with two matches taking place per day. The top four teams in the group advanced to the semi-finals. All matches took place at the Dubai International Cricket Stadium.

The group worked on a points system with positions being based on the total points. Points were awarded as follows:

Win: 3 points. 
Tie: 1 point. 
Loss: 0 points.
Abandoned/No Result: 1 point.
Bonus Point: 1 point awarded to the team with the highest score after 10 overs of the batting innings.

Teams

Points table

 Advanced to knockout stages

Source: ESPNcricinfo

Fixtures

Group stage

Knockout stages

Semi-finals

Third-place play-off

Final

Statistics

Most runs

Source: ESPNcricinfo

Most wickets

Source: ESPNcricinfo

References

Further reading

External links
 Series home at ESPN Cricinfo

FairBreak Invitational T20
FairBreak Invitational T20
Cricket in the United Arab Emirates